This article is about the particular significance of the year 1718 to Wales and its people.

Incumbents
Lord Lieutenant of North Wales (Lord Lieutenant of Anglesey, Caernarvonshire, Denbighshire, Flintshire, Merionethshire, Montgomeryshire) – Hugh Cholmondeley, 1st Earl of Cholmondeley 
Lord Lieutenant of Glamorgan – vacant until 1729
Lord Lieutenant of Brecknockshire and Lord Lieutenant of Monmouthshire – John Morgan (of Rhiwpera)
Lord Lieutenant of Cardiganshire – John Vaughan, 1st Viscount Lisburne
Lord Lieutenant of Carmarthenshire – vacant until 1755
Lord Lieutenant of Pembrokeshire – Sir Arthur Owen, 3rd Baronet
Lord Lieutenant of Radnorshire – Thomas Coningsby, 1st Earl Coningsby

Bishop of Bangor – Benjamin Hoadly
Bishop of Llandaff – John Tyler
Bishop of St Asaph – John Wynne
Bishop of St Davids – Adam Ottley

Events
February - Prince George William of Wales falls ill (later diagnosed as a heart disease); his parents, the Prince and Princess of Wales, are allowed by King George I to visit him at Kensington Palace, despite having been banished from the royal presence a few months earlier.
11 July - Howell Davis, mate of the Cadogan, is captured by Edward England and decides join the pirates. Davis would subsequently capture another Welsh sailor, Bartholomew Roberts, and turn him to piracy.
9 November - Theophilus Evans is ordained by the Bishop of St David's.
date unknown - The first permanent printing press in Wales is established at Adpar, Cardiganshire.

Arts and literature

New books
Ifan Gruffudd & Samuel Williams - Pedwar o Ganuau
Thomas Taylor - The Principality of Wales exactly described... (the first atlas of Wales to be published)
Alban Thomas - Cân o Senn i'w hen Feistr Tobacco

Births
July - William Jones, Methodist exhorter (died c.1773)
date unknown - Sir Hugh Williams, 8th Baronet (died 1794)

Deaths
17 February - Prince George William of Wales, the second son of the Prince and Princess of Wales, aged three months 
30 April - Sir James Morgan, 4th Baronet,
1 May - Robert Daniell, coloniser of The Carolinas, 71 or 72
26 December - Mary Steele, wife of Sir Richard Steele, 40
date unknown
Sir Edward Broughton of Marchwiel, former High Sheriff of Denbighshire
William Evans, dissenting minister
Sir William Myddelton, 4th Baronet, of Chirk

See also
1718 in Scotland

References

1710s in Wales
Years of the 18th century in Wales